The Dassault M.D.320 Hirondelle was a French 14-seat utility transport aircraft of the 1960s, designed and built by Dassault Aviation, in prototype form only.

Design and development
In 1967 the French Air Force, investigating replacement aircraft for the Douglas DC-3 and Beechcraft 18 twin-engine aircraft being used for light transport and pilot navigation training, solicited proposals from the French industrial community, specifying that any submittals would be powered by  Turbomeca Astazou turboprops.

In response to this request, Dassault designed and constructed a single prototype M.D.320, later named Hirondelle (Swallow).  Design and construction were fairly rapid, due to extensive use of Dassault Falcon 20 elements such as the fuselage. The fuselage length and volume were identical to the Falcon 20, and its wing and control surfaces were adaptations of the 20.

The Hirondelle was an all-metal low-wing monoplane with swept vertical tail and slightly swept wing and tailplane, supported on a retractable tricycle undercarriage, with the main gear retracting into the engine nacelles.

The Hirondelle had a circular cross-section fuselage with accommodation for a crew of two and room for a maximum of 14 passengers with 5 round windows on each side of the pressurized cabin.

The prototype, (French civil registration F-WPXB), was powered by two Turbomeca Astazou XIVD turboprop engines mounted in wing nacelles, driving three-blade fully feathering propellers. Production aircraft would have been powered by Turbomeca Astazou XVI engines.

The airframe was designed using fail-safe principles and the wings contained integral fuel cells.

Orperational history
The prototype first flew on 11 September 1968, at Bordeaux-Mérignac.

In 1968 the French Air Force procurement office reversed its previous position and announced that it was seeking jet-powered aircraft for the DC-3/Beechcraft 18 replacement program. Thus there was no further official interest in the Hirondelle, and no further examples were constructed.

The experience gained in the Hirondelle program was applied to the subsequent Dassault Falcon 10 project, the prototype of which first flew in 1970.

The Hirondelle was the last propeller-powered aircraft to be designed by Dassault.

Specifications (M.D.320 Hirondelle)

See also

References

 
 Dassault website (in French)
 Information on Hirondelle program
 Description of Hirondelle program

Hirondelle
1960s French military utility aircraft
Cancelled military aircraft projects of France
Low-wing aircraft
Twin-turboprop tractor aircraft
Aircraft first flown in 1968